Swanston may refer to:

Places
Australia
 Swanston Street, Melbourne
 Swanston, Tasmania, a rural locality in Australia
UK
 Swanston, Edinburgh, a village in Scotland
US
 Swanston (Sacramento RT), a light rail station in California
 Swanston Estates, a neighborhood in North Sacramento, California

Other uses
 HMS Swanston, a Ton class minesweeper
 Swanston (surname)

See also
 Swanson (disambiguation)
 Swanton (disambiguation)